Datuk Amar Michael Manyin anak Jawong (born 25 May 1944) is a Malaysian politician who served as Member of the Sarawak State Legislative Assembly (MLA) for Tebedu from September 1996 to his retirement in December 2021. From 2017 to 2022, he served as the Minister of Education, Science and Technological Research. He previously held a post of Urban Development and Tourism Minister and Sarawak Youth, Sports and Solidarity Minister. He was an educator before joining politics, and was the principal of Kolej Datu Patinggi Abang Haji Abdillah.

Honours

Honours of Malaysia
  :
  Member of the Order of the Defender of the Realm (AMN) (1994)

  :
  Commander of the Order of the Star of Hornbill Sarawak (PGBK) - Datuk (2002)
  Knight Commander of the Order of the Star of Sarawak (PNBS) - Dato' Sri (2009)
  Knight Commander of the Order of the Star of Hornbill Sarawak (DA) - Datuk Amar (2020)

References

External links 

 Dewan Undangan Negeri Sarawak Kawasan Pilihanraya: N.18 TEBEDU

Living people
People from Sarawak
1944 births
Parti Pesaka Bumiputera Bersatu politicians
Sarawak state ministers
Members of the Sarawak State Legislative Assembly
Knights Commander of the Most Exalted Order of the Star of Sarawak
Members of the Order of the Defender of the Realm
Bidayuh people
Knights Commander of the Order of the Star of Hornbill Sarawak
Commanders of the Order of the Star of Hornbill Sarawak